Solidarity and Democracy was a political party in Peru formed by a group of technocrats. SODE participated in elections on the lists of APRA in 1985, on the lists of FREDEMO in 1990, and ran alone in 1992.

Defunct political parties in Peru